Cowichan-Malahat was a provincial electoral district in the Canadian province of British Columbia. It first appeared in the general election of 1966. In the 1991 general election, it was succeeded by Cowichan-Ladysmith and Malahat-Juan de Fuca.

Demographics

Geography

History

1999 redistribution

Member of Legislative Assembly

Election results
Note: Winners of each election are in bold.

|-

|- bgcolor="white"
!align="right" colspan=3|Total valid votes
!align="right"|10,841
!align="right"|100.00%
!align="right"|
!align="right"|
|- bgcolor="white"
!align="right" colspan=3|Total rejected ballots
!align="right"|81
!align="right"|%
!align="right"|
!align="right"|
|- bgcolor="white"
!align="right" colspan=3|Turnout
!align="right"|
!align="right"|%
!align="right"|
!align="right"|
|}

|-

|Independent
|Kenneth Leslie Craig Hassenen
|align="right"|76 	 	
|align="right"|0.49%
|align="right"|
|align="right"|

|- bgcolor="white"
!align="right" colspan=3|Total valid votes
!align="right"|15,510 		
!align="right"|100.00%
!align="right"|
!align="right"|
|- bgcolor="white"
!align="right" colspan=3|Total rejected ballots
!align="right"|127
!align="right"|%
!align="right"|
!align="right"|
|- bgcolor="white"
!align="right" colspan=3|Turnout
!align="right"|
!align="right"|%
!align="right"|
!align="right"|
|}

|-

|Independent
|Kenneth Leslie Craig Hassenen
|align="right"|70	 	
|align="right"|0.38%
|align="right"|
|align="right"|

|Progressive Conservative
|GJames William Quaife
|align="right"|2,101 		 		
|align="right"|11.52%
|align="right"|
|align="right"|

|- bgcolor="white"
!align="right" colspan=3|Total valid votes
!align="right"|18,240 	 
!align="right"|100.00%
!align="right"|
!align="right"|
|- bgcolor="white"
!align="right" colspan=3|Total rejected ballots
!align="right"|203
!align="right"|%
!align="right"|
!align="right"|
|- bgcolor="white"
!align="right" colspan=3|Turnout
!align="right"|
!align="right"|%
!align="right"|
!align="right"|
|}

|-

|Independent
|Andrew Basil Bigg
|align="right"|559 	
|align="right"|2.60%
|align="right"|
|align="right"|

|- bgcolor="white"
!align="right" colspan=3|Total valid votes
!align="right"|21,465
!align="right"|100.00%
!align="right"|
!align="right"|
|- bgcolor="white"
!align="right" colspan=3|Total rejected ballots
!align="right"|188
!align="right"|%
!align="right"|
!align="right"|
|- bgcolor="white"
!align="right" colspan=3|Turnout
!align="right"|
!align="right"|%
!align="right"|
!align="right"|
|}

|-

 
|Progressive Conservative
|Kenneth Paskin
|align="right"|1,113 			
|align="right"|5.95%
|align="right"|
|align="right"|

|- bgcolor="white"
!align="right" colspan=3|Total valid votes
!align="right"|18,698 
!align="right"|100.00%
!align="right"|
!align="right"|
|- bgcolor="white"
!align="right" colspan=3|Total rejected ballots
!align="right"|180
!align="right"|%
!align="right"|
!align="right"|
|- bgcolor="white"
!align="right" colspan=3|Turnout
!align="right"|
!align="right"|%
!align="right"|
!align="right"|
|}  	  	  	

|-

|Independent
|Louis James Lesosky
|align="right"|101 	 	
|align="right"|0.44%
|align="right"|
|align="right"|

|- bgcolor="white"
!align="right" colspan=3|Total valid votes
!align="right"| 22,853 
!align="right"|100.00%
!align="right"|
!align="right"|
|- bgcolor="white"
!align="right" colspan=3|Total rejected ballots
!align="right"|245
!align="right"|%
!align="right"|
!align="right"|
|- bgcolor="white"
!align="right" colspan=3|Turnout
!align="right"|
!align="right"|%
!align="right"|
!align="right"|
|- bgcolor="white"
!align="right" colspan=7|
|}

|-

|- bgcolor="white"
!align="right" colspan=3|Total valid votes
!align="right"|23,046
!align="right"|100.00%
!align="right"|
!align="right"|
|- bgcolor="white"
!align="right" colspan=3|Total rejected ballots
!align="right"|317
!align="right"|%
!align="right"|
!align="right"|
|- bgcolor="white"
!align="right" colspan=3|Turnout
!align="right"|
!align="right"|%
!align="right"|
!align="right"|
|- bgcolor="white"
!align="right" colspan=7|1 two-member seat during this election
|}

Sources
 Elections BC website - historical election data

Former provincial electoral districts of British Columbia on Vancouver Island